Sunburn Festival is a commercial electronic dance music festival held in India. Incepted by Serial Entrepreneur Shailendra Singh while Jt MD of Percept Ltd, under his captaincy, the festival grew to be ranked the 3rd largest dance festival in the world and "as big as Tomorrowland and Ultra" as per the IMS APAC Business Report 2014. It was ranked by CNN in 2009 as one of the Top 10 Festivals in the world. Spanning over three - five days, the festival has multiple stages with artists playing simultaneously. Held annually in Vagator, Goa between 2007 and 2015, in 2016 it was shifted to Pune, Maharashtra. In 2019, the festival returned to its home town in Vagator, Goa.

In 2011, in order to give fans a fully immersive, DJ-centric experience, Percept Ltd launched the first Sunburn Arena, featuring Avicii, at the Turf Club in Mumbai. In 2012, in order to bring the Sunburn to the fans, Percept launched Sunburn City Festival, Sunburn Campus and Sunburn Reload, as well as their first international festival, Sunburn Colombo. Over the years Sunburn has expanded internationally and toured the majority of Top 100 DJs in the world, including : Swedish House Mafia, Hardwell, David Guetta, Axwell, Dimitri Vegas and Like Mike, Paul Van Dyk, Marshmello, Chainsmokers, Afrojack, Pete Tong, Tiesto, Armin van Buren, DeadMau5, Carl Cox, DJ Snake, Skazi and so many more.

As a global music tourism destination, witnessed by fans around the world and with overseas expansion, Sunburn has created history as the second-ever intellectual property to be exported from India (after IPL).

In 2022, Goa Sunburn association has decided to add Goa village At Sunburn . Which is an exclusive zone to showcase & promote local Goan Art & Culture during celebration of Sunburn Festival at Vagator

History
Electronic music parties/events/festivals are not new to Goa and much earlier pioneers of free party's/events/festivals with live DJs mixing, art, crafts and food stalls started in the late 1980s and continued through all of the 1990s into the early 2000s where they played Goa trance, Psychedelic trance, and Techno and were held at Vagator Beach, Anjuna beach and Arambol beach. The arrival of commercialized events such as Sunburn arrived in Goa when mainstream electronic dance music gained more widespread popularity within India.

Sunburn Goa 2007
In 2007, to provide a new form of entertainment for the nation's 553 mn Indians under the age of 25, Shailendra Singh organized the first international dance music festival in Goa, India. It took place on 28 & 29 December at Candolim Beach. First year performers included Carl Cox, Above & Beyond and Axwell as headline acts. Held on two stages, with DJs playing simultaneously, other acts included John 00 Fleming, Pete Gooding, DJ Pearl, Jalebee Cartel, Super 8 & Tab. The festival was hosted by Nikhil Chinapa and Rohit Barker.

Sunburn Goa 2008
Sunburn Goa 2008 was themed Electric Circus and was held on two main stages: "Banyan Tree" for Trance acts and "Circus Stage" for House music. Having tied up with Defected Records in 2008, the label brought house DJs Simon Dunmore, Shapeshifters, Copyright and percussionist Shovel playing. Headlining the festival were GMS, Gareth Emery and John 00 Fleming. The acts were Digital Blonde, Roger Shah, DJ Pearl, Brute Force, Nawed Khan, Vachan Chinnappa, Jalebee Cartel, Sanjay Dutta, and Ma Faiza. The visuals were produced by Dan booth, Martin Robins, Vj Kaycee & Inferno. Sunburn Goa 2008 took place on 27–29 December at Candolim Beach Goa.

Sunburn Goa 2009
Sunburn brought DJ Armin Van Buuren, who headlined the festival along with Latin House DJs Roger Sanchez and John 00 Fleming. Sunburn's line-up also included tech house DJ Sultan and Trance DJ Sander Van Doorn. Previously in 2008, Sunburn had tied up with Defected Records, but in 2009 Sunburn tied up with UK clubbing company Gatecrashers. Acts included Jalebee Cartel, DJ Pearl, Ma Faiza, Nawed Khan and Designer Hippies. The festival was hosted by Nikhil Chinapa and Rohit Barker.

Sunburn Goa 2010

Sunburn Goa 2010 took place on 27–29 December at Candolim Beach. The headliners of the 2010 festival were Paul Van Dyk, Ferry Corsten and Axwell along with Sultan & Ned Shepard with Nadia Ali (Live), Richard Durand, GMS, Pete Gooding, Aly & Fila and DJs DJ Pearl, Ma Faiza, Anish Sood and Sanjay Dutta.

For the 2010 festival, Percept ran a "Sunburn Anthem Contest" for potential audio and visual producers, with participants in the visual category allowed to make a visual for a B.R.E.E.D track which is then submitted to a panel of judges. Participants in the audio category were asked to make a fresh remix of Nadia Ali's ‘Love Story’ which is the Anthem of the festival.

Sunburn passes went live on 5 November 2010 with the early bird passes and pre-booking sale passes being sold out in 22 minutes.

Sunburn Goa 2011

Sunburn Goa 2011 was held on 27–29 December at Candolim Beach. The main attraction was Above & Beyond, Axwell, Infected Mushroom, Spartaque.

Sunburn Goa 2012
Sunburn Festival 2012 was held in Candolim, Goa, India during 27, 28 Dec & 29. Headlining acts in 2012 were by Sander Van Doorn, BT, Fedde Le Grand, W & W, Paul van Dyk, Roger Sanchez. After-parties for Sunburn 2012 were held at LPK (Love Passion Karma) and Sinq.

Sunburn Goa 2013

The 7th Edition of Sunburn at Goa took place in Vagator witnessed around 120 Artists and over 200 hours of Music. it had over 10,000sq.m, of exotic festival area with 7 massive stages. Headline DJs were Afrojack, Axwell, Pete Tong, Ummet Ozcan and many more Over 1 Lakh participants were expected.

Sunburn concerts in IITs, NITs, LNMIIT, BITS, IIMs, IISERs& Other Colleges
Many colleges housed Sunburn concerts. BITS Pilani Goa Campus was the first college to ever host the sunburn on campus.

NIT Calicut hosted Sunburn in October 2013 (ft. DJ Clement) as a part of their Annual Technical Festival Tathva. Thakur College of Engineering & Technology- Mumbai hosted Sunburn in September 2013 (featuring DJ Candice Redding and NDS & BLU) additionally, BITS Pilani, Pilani Campus also successfully hosted Sunburn during Oasis 2014, the annual cultural festival of BITS Pilani. Annual cultural fest of LNMIIT Vivacity was first to host sunburn festival in Rajasthan in 2015. AAROHI, the annual cultural festival of VNIT, Nagpur, witnessed the performance by DJ Kash Trivedi at Sunburn Campus in 2015. DCSMAT Institutions, Vagamon hosted sunburn on their campus for the first time during LUMINANCE 2K15 and has been hosting them since then till 2018. Candice Redding along with DJ Shaan had performed in the second edition of Sunburn at Vivacity 2016. This was the only time when the passes of Sunburn were free of cost. NIT Trichy hosted Sunburn (featuring DJ Candice Redding) during Festember '14, their annual cultural festival. IIIT-Bhubaneswar also successfully hosted Sunburn in ADVAITA 2014, Annual Cultural festival of IIIT Bhubaneswar. IIM Kashipur also hosted Sunburn in January 2015 as a part of their Cultural Fest Agnitraya 2015. Other institutes like Graphic Era University, Dehradun in May 2015 and Birla Institute of Technology, Mesra (March 2015) also hosted Sunburn of their annual festival. IIT Indore hosted sunburn in Fluxus 2016.

Jaypee University of Information Technology, Solan (HP) hosted Sunburn in LE FIESTUS 2015 include Sunburn festival with DJ LIZA BROWN and LOST STORIES.

Jaypee University of Engineering & Technology, Guna (MP) hosted Sunburn in D'Equinox 2016 include Sunburn festival with Ankur Sood, Progressive Brothers and Candice Redding but it turned out to be a flop event. MBM engineering college, Jodhpur also hosted sunburn in April 2016 as a part of their fest vigour2k16.

Biggest ever Sunburn Campus was hosted by Antaragni, IIT Kanpur in 2017 where Kshmr performed in his first ever college show.

In January 2018, Indian Institute of Science Education and Research, Bhopal hosted Sunburn featuring Nina Suerete and Get Massive as part of the institute's annual cultural fest Enthuzia, 2018.

Recently in March 2018, Government Engineering College Calicut also hosted Sunburn with sax DJ Ola Ras and Gaurav Mehta. On 15 December 2019, NIT Raipur also hosted Sunburn Campus on its annual sports fest "SAMAR".

In February 2020, Indian Institute Of Information Technology Gwalior hosted Sunburn featuring Olly Esse and AceAxe. In March 2020 Government Engineering College Palakkad hosted Sunburn featuring Olly Esse.
On March 14, 2020, Government Engineering College Trivandrum, Barton Hill hosted Sunburn featuring Progressive Brothers.

Sunburn Goa 2014
The 8th edition took place in Vagator on 27 to 30 December 2014 and for the first time the festival was extended for an extra day and was performed by DJs like Dimitri Vegas & Like Mike and around 150 other DJs. Known artists includes Knife Party, Sander van Doorn, Sasha, Krewella, Baauer, Danny Avila, Head Hunterz, Deniz Koyu, Dubvision, Paul Oakenfold, Matthew Koma, MAKJ, Michael and Tarzan Woods.

Sunburn Goa 2015
The 9th edition was another 4 day event at Vagator, Goa. On 20 November 2015 Sunburn Goa's international ticketing partner, Viagogo, announced that the festival has become one of the largest international music festivals in Asia, The artist lineup would countover 120 artists like Sam Feldt, KYGO, Seth Troxler, Dimitri Vegas & Like Mike, Martin Garrix, DJ SMITH, Kshmr, David Guetta, Dyro, Felix Jaehn, Zaeden and Art Department taking the stage.

Sunburn Pune 2016 
The 10th anniversary celebration of Sunburn festival took place in Pune, Maharashtra. After much controversy of festival being moved from Goa and finding a new home in Pune, Sunburn finally took place from 28 December to 31 December at the Kesanand Hills, Pune. The festival was headlined by Armin Van Buerren, Axwell & Ingrosso, Dimitri Vegas & Like Mike, Afrojack and finally a 90-minute midnight set by Kshmr.

Sunburn Pune 2017 
11th edition of sunburn festival took place in Oxford Golf resort, Pune, Maharashtra. The lineup for its 11th edition was KSHMR, Dimitri Vegas & Like Mike,  DJ Snake, Martin Garrix, Afrojack, Clean Bandit.
Martin Garrix closed the Sunburn Festival 2017.

Gallery

See also

List of electronic music festivals
 Music festival

References

External links
 Goa Village At Sunburn 2022
 official website
 Sunburn Noida 2012
 Sunburn on ZEE5
 Inceptor, Shailendra Singh

Music festivals established in 2007
Tourist attractions in North Goa district
Culture of Pune
Electronic music festivals in India
Festivals in Goa
Events in Pune